Luo Yufeng (born June 24, 1998 in Beijing, China) is a Chinese-American racing driver. He is the 2015 Formula Continental champion and 2018 F4 Chinese Championship vice-champion.

Career
In his debut season, 2014, Luo raced in the Formula Continental and Pacific F2000 series. In the SCCA Majors Tour Western Conference Luo won at Tulsa Raceway Park. The Chinese driver, competing in a Van Diemen DP08, finished third in the series standings. Luo joined the Pacific F2000 series at Buttonwillow Raceway Park and Portland International Raceway finishing all races on the podium. The young driver qualified for the SCCA National Championship Runoffs in the Formula Continental class. Racing with David Freitas Racing Luo finished the race in fifth place.

For 2015, Luo stepped up to the U.S. F2000 National Championship with Pabst Racing Services. His season started in February with the 2015 U.S. F2000 Winterfest at NOLA Motorsports Park. At the Winterfest, the driver scored two top ten finishes. During the regular season, Luo was a consistent finisher with only one retirement. Luo's best results were three fifth places at St. Petersburg, Indianapolis and Lucas Oil Raceway. The driver finished seventh in the series championship standings, the fourth best rookie. In the SCCA Formula Continental class, Luo entered in four races, winning them all. He therefore qualified for the SCCA National Championship Runoffs. At the Runoffs, Luo lead every practice, qualified on pole, and lead every lap of the race to become the youngest ever Formula Continental champion.

For 2016, Luo remained at Pabst Racing Services in the U.S. F2000 National Championship. The driver scored his best results in the opening weekend at St. Petersburg scoring a second place and a win making him the first Chinese driver to win in the Road to Indy ladder series. Luo again finished seventh in the series standings. He made a one-off appearance in the Lamborghini Super Trofeo series at Virginia International Raceway winning the Pro-Am Category.

Luo competed in 5 rounds of the Pirelli World Challenge with Bentley Absolute Racing in 2017. His best result came at Canadian Tire Motorsport Park where he placed 3rd.

Racing record

Career summary

SCCA National Championship Runoffs

American Open-Wheel racing results
(key) (Races in bold indicate pole position, races in italics indicate fastest race lap)

USF2000 National Championship results

F4 Chinese Championship results

References

Living people
1998 births
Chinese racing drivers
SCCA National Championship Runoffs winners
U.S. F2000 National Championship drivers
US RaceTronics drivers
Chinese F4 Championship drivers
Sportspeople from Beijing